Richard Lester Disney (June 6, 1887 – February 17, 1976) was a judge of the United States Tax Court from 1936 to 1951.

Early life, education, and career
Born in Richland, Kansas, he was the brother of future-Congressman Wesley E. Disney. Disney was a Rhodes Scholar, and received a Bachelor of Arts in Jurisprudence from the University of Oxford in 1912. Disney served two terms in the Kansas House of Representatives, from 1914 to 1917, later moving to Oklahoma, where he entered the practice of law.

Judicial service and later life
In 1936, President Franklin D. Roosevelt nominated Disney to a seat on the United States Board of Tax Appeals. At the time, Disney was himself a candidate for a seat in the United States Congress, from which he indicated he would not withdraw until confirmed by the U.S. Senate for the Board of Tax Appeals appointment. Disney was reappointed to President Harry S. Truman, and retired from the United States Tax Court effective December 31, 1951. He thereafter "headed the Rhodes Scholarship Committee in Oklahoma for a generation".

Personal life and death
On September 6, 1914, Disney married Harriet Florence Mitchell in Neodesha, Kansas, with whom he had two sons and two daughters. Harriet died in 1969, and Disney died in 1976, and the age of 88.

References

1887 births
1976 deaths
People from Shawnee County, Kansas
Alumni of the University of Oxford
American Rhodes Scholars
Members of the Kansas House of Representatives
Members of the United States Board of Tax Appeals
Judges of the United States Tax Court
United States Article I federal judges appointed by Franklin D. Roosevelt
United States Article I federal judges appointed by Harry S. Truman